The 2022 USA Sevens was the seventeenth edition of the rugby sevens tournament. It was held at Dignity Health Sports Park in Carson, Los Angeles, California between 27 and 28 August 2022. The title defenders were five-time USA Sevens champions South Africa.

The final event of the season saw the most competitive sole event in World Rugby Sevens Series history as all sixteen core teams vied for the event title, four of whom were simultaneously vying for the series title (South Africa, Australia, Argentina, Fiji).

On the season standings for the 2021–22 season post-London were the most competitive since the establishment of the Sevens Series, with just six points separating the top three teams (two points between the top two). There were four teams mathematically capable of winning the series, depending on the results of this event.

At the conclusion of day one, when all the pool fixtures had been played, South Africa finished third in their pool, thus were not eligible to play in the Cup playoffs and were eliminated from winning the event and the series.

The tournament was won by New Zealand, who claimed their first win in the series after beating Fiji 28–21. This, along with Argentina being knocked out in the quarter finals, South Africa being knocked out in the pool stages, and Australia claiming third after beating Samoa 21–7,  meant that Australia were crowned champions of the world series for the first time,

Format
The sixteen teams were drawn into four pools of four. Each team played the three opponents in their pool once. The top two teams from each pool advanced to the Cup bracket, with the losers of the quarter-finals vying for a fifth-place finish. The remaining eight teams that finished third or fourth in their pool played off for 9th place, with the losers of the 9th-place quarter-finals competing for 13th place.

Teams 
The sixteen national teams competing in Los Angeles were:

Pool stage
 Team advances to the Cup Quarter-finals

Pool A

Pool B

Pool C

Pool D

Knockout stage

13th–16th playoffs

9th–12th playoffs

5th–8th playoffs

Cup playoffs

Placings

References

  

2022
2021–22 World Rugby Sevens Series
2022 rugby sevens competitions
August 2022 sports events in the United States
USA Sevens 2022
2022 in American rugby union